The 2013–14 St. Louis Blues season was the 47th season for the National Hockey League (NHL) franchise that was established on June 5, 1967. They were eliminated in the first round of the 2014 Stanley Cup playoffs by the Chicago Blackhawks, four games to two.

Regular season

October
Jaroslav Halak became the Blues' leader in shutouts with his 17th on October 5, with a 7–0 victory over the Florida Panthers at the Scottrade Center, surpassing Glenn Hall's 16. Hall's record took 140 games (1968–1971), while Halak's took him only 121 games since he joined the Blues in June 2010.

The Blues have opened the season with a 4–0 start on October 12 with a home win against the New York Rangers, the first time they have started that perfectly in their 47-year history. The game was also their 10th consecutive home win dating back to last season.

November
Alexander Steen was named the First Star of the Month for October on November 1, having the best start of his NHL career. He scored 11 goals, including four power-play goals, and sat fourth in the NHL with 16 points in the team's 10 games played for the month.

The Blues' telecasts earned the highest ratings in October in the team's 18 seasons on Fox Sports Midwest, with a 3.5 rating, 94% higher than in October 2011 (1.8), and 13% higher than the team's previous October best, a 3.1 in 1997. The Blues were 7–1–1 in October.

Steen scored his NHL-leading 14th goal on November 7 against the Calgary Flames, the game-winner. Alexander Ovechkin and Steven Stamkos had tied him with their 13th earlier in the evening. He was the first Blues' player to score 14 goals in the team's first 14 games since the 1991 season, when Brett Hull scored 16. Maxim Lapierre scored his first goal as a Blue and goaltender Brian Elliott earned his 100th career win in stopping 18 shots out of 20. Jordan Leopold got his first two points of the season (both assists), while Kevin Shattenkirk got an assist on the Blues' second goal, giving him at least one in his seventh consecutive game, the longest in the NHL this season. He has eight in that span.

On November 16, Steen scored his NHL-leading 17th goal, the game-winner with 6:20 into the third period, and earlier added an assist to pass Sidney Crosby for the points lead at 26, in a 4–2 win over the Carolina Hurricanes. Steen also extended his NHL-best points streak to 13 games, totaling 13 goals and five assists in that stretch. Blues' Head Coach Ken Hitchcock also won his 618th game, passing Jacques Lemaire for ninth place on the all-time list. Steen's consecutive game streak of at least one point ended at 13, in the next game on Nov. 17.

On November 23, Coach Hitchcock got his 621st win, passing Bryan Murray for eighth place on the all-time list.

On November 25, Jaroslav Halak got his 27th career shutout, a franchise-record 18th as a member of the Blues and his second this season.

On November 27, Steen scored his 20th goal, tying Alexander Ovechkin for the NHL lead, in the Blues' fifth consecutive win. The Blues were 10–1–1 in their past 12 games for a 19–3–3 record and 41 points.

December
Alexander Steen scored his 23rd and 24th goals in a 5–1 win on December 19, after earlier in the day signing a 3-year, $17.4 million contract extension to keep him as a Blue through to the 2016–17 season. His 24 goals, tying his career-high after only 34 team games (23–7–4), were second in the NHL only to the 28 scored by Alexander Ovechkin. Brenden Morrow earned his 300th career assist. The team was 48–0–1 in the previous 49 home games when scoring three goals or more. Steen, the second-highest goal scorer in the NHL with 24, was sidelined with an upper-body injury during the second period of the December 21 game against the Edmonton Oilers. He was placed on injured reserve with a concussion on December 28. He had last played on December 21, leaving in the second period. He led the Blues with 24 goals (second in the NHL) and 38 points.

Chris Stewart was named First Star of the Week on December 23, for his performance in the week ending December 22, after earning six goals and one assist. He beat Sidney Crosby (Pittsburgh) and Matt Duchene (Colorado).

On December 23, the prime minister of Canada, Stephen Harper, attended the Blues' game in Calgary against the Flames.

On December 28, the Blues beat the Chicago Blackhawks in a thrilling 6–5 shootout at Scottrade to gain a point on the Blackhawks, and now within six points of division-leading Chicago, but with four games fewer played. The Blues were twice down by two goals, but came back to tie in regulation and then through a scoreless overtime. The Blues have beaten Chicago all three games played with two coming in shootouts, with this game playing without their top scorer, Alexander Steen. Dmitrij Jaskin scored his first NHL goal.

January
Three Blues' players were named to the 2014 Winter Olympics, men's USA Olympic team in Sochi, (February 7–23). David Backes, 29, T. J. Oshie, 27, and Kevin Shattenkirk (to be 25 then), were named to the team after the 2014 Winter Classic game on January 1. Backes (Minneapolis, Minnesota) was named to the USA Olympic team for the second time, Oshie (Everett, Washington), and Shattenkirk (New Rochelle, New York) for the first.

Vladimir Sobotka was named to the Czech Republic's men's Olympic team, but a leg injury on January 31 prevented him from participating in the Olympics.

The Blues had their best start in the first half of the season (41 games) in team history after the January 4 game, with a 29–7–5 record and 63 points.

Goalie Brian Elliott was named the NHL's Second Star of the Week on January 6 for the week ending Jan. 5, after posting a glittering 3–0–0 record with a 1.00 GAA and a 0.962 save percentage, including one shutout, the 24th of his career and 15th with the Blues. That was one shy of Glenn Hall for #2 in team history. He came within eight seconds of a second shutout against the Minnesota Wild on New Year's Eve.

Jay Bouwmeester, 30, and Alex Pietrangelo (to be 24 then), both defensemen, represented Canada on the men's Olympic team.

Vladimir Tarasenko represented Russia on the men's Olympic team. He was a native of Yaroslavl.

Jaroslav Halak represented Slovakia on the men's Olympic team.

The Blues were back on top of the TSN Power Rankings on January 13, and had a +1.34 per game goal differential.

Alexander Steen returned to a full practice with the Blues on January 13, still out with a concussion. He led the Blues in goals (24) and scoring (38 points) as of his December 21 injury. His 38 points were fifth in the NHL. This was his concussion, after losing 39 games during the 2011–12 season. The Blues were able to play at a 7–1–1 pace in his nine missed games, through January 10. His 38 points led the Blues until T. J. Oshie scored twice in the January 14 game, giving Oshie 39 points with a team-leading 29 assists to go with 10 goals, but playing in 45 games to Steen's 35 games. He was activated on January 17, after missing 11 games since his concussion on December 21. He was fifth-ranked in goals with 24. Named to Sweden's men's Olympic team, as was teammate Patrik Berglund. They were selected on January 7. Steen, 29, representing Sweden for the fourth time overall, first time at the Olympics. Berglund, 25, for the fifth time overall, first time at the Olympics. Altogether, 10 Blues' players have been selected to five countries' Olympic teams.

February
On February 6, coach Ken Hitchcock won his 110th game with the Blues, tying him for fourth place with Scotty Bowman on the Blues' list. With the OT win, the Blues moved within two points of Chicago for first place in the Central Division, and three points of the NHL-leading Anaheim Ducks.

On February 15, at the 2014 Winter Olympics in Sochi, T. J. Oshie scored four shootout goals in six attempts (in a preliminary round only for seeding purposes), including the game-winner in a thrilling 3–2 win for the U.S. over Russia in front of 11,678 screaming fans at the Bolshoy Ice Dome. Video. Oshie was a player on the "bubble" whether the U.S. team would add him to its roster or not, but took him because of his success rate in shootouts. At the time of the Olympic break after the February 8 game, Oshie was tied for the team lead in points (46, 14 goals and 32 assists in 57G) with team goal-scoring leader Alexander Steen (28 goals and 18 assists in 46G).

On February 28, the Blues traded Jaroslav Halak and Chris Stewart, along with minor leaguer William Carrier and a first-round pick in 2015 and third-round pick in 2016, in exchange for goaltender Ryan Miller and forward Steve Ott of the Buffalo Sabres. Miller and Ott joined the Blues on Sunday for their road game against the Phoenix Coyotes.

March
The Blues took over the top spot in the NHL after their March 9 win with 94 points, and became the first team to pass the 100-point level (47–14–7), for the sixth time in their history after beating the Winnipeg Jets on March 17. On March 16, the team lost forward Vladimir Tarasenko because of a hand injury from the previous game on March 15. T. J. Oshie missed his first game of the year, the wild St. Patrick's Day game with numerous fights, to see the birth of his daughter earlier in the day. The Blues are four points ahead of their closest competitors, the Boston Bruins, Anaheim Ducks, and San Jose Sharks for the Presidents' Trophy with 14 games to play.

On March 22, the Blues clinched a playoff spot for the third consecutive season and 38th in franchise history, after the Phoenix Coyotes lost after the Blues lost to the Philadelphia Flyers. The Blues lead the Western Conference with 101 points (47–16–7) with 12 games remaining.

With his 16th career shutout for the Blues and 25th career shutout on March 24, Brian Elliott tied Glenn Hall for second place. He accomplished his 25th shutout in only his 209th start. It was the fifth fastest to 25 shutouts in modern NHL history. After 28 games, Elliott has a 17–5–2 record, 1.97 GAA, a .921 save percentage and fourth shutout this year. Jaroslav Halak holds the Blues' record with 20 shutouts.

T. J. Oshie was named the NHL's Third Star of the Week on March 31, for the week ending March 30. He tied for second place with six points in three games, including his first career hat trick on March 27.

April
The Blues set a new team wins record with their 52nd on April 3, breaking the record held by the 1999–2000 Blues team that had 51 wins, 114 points, and won the Presidents' Trophy that season. They were in a strong position for the trophy with 111 points (52–17–7), over Boston by losing one less game then the Bruins, with six games remaining.

On April 4, Alexander Steen was nominated by the St. Louis chapter of the Professional Hockey Writers' Association for the Bill Masterton Memorial Trophy. The trophy is awarded annually to the player "who best exemplifies the qualities of perseverance, sportsmanship and dedication to hockey." Steen led the Blues with 33 goals, and was tied for the team lead with 60 points despite losing 11 games from a concussion in December.

The Blues Central Division lead evaporated after their fourth consecutive loss on April 10, while the Colorado Avalanche won, tying the Blues with 111 points, but having the season's head-to-head advantage over the Blues.

T. J. Oshie was hit high by the Wild's Michael Rupp on April 10, in the middle of the second period. Rupp was immediately given a 10-minute match penalty, and subsequently a four-game suspension without pay, from the NHL Department of Player Safety for the illegal hit to the head. The suspension covers the last regular season game and three playoff games. Rupp forfeited $7,692 for those four games. Oshie had 21 goals, and was second on the team with 60 points.

Just before the regular season came to an end, the Blues were battling several key injuries which contributed to their season-high five-game losing streak headed into the final game on April 13. T. J. Oshie, David Backes, Vladimir Sobotka, Derek Roy, Brenden Morrow and long-injured Vladimir Tarasenko were available for the final game. Patrik Berglund got hurt in the final period of the April 12 game. The playoffs started on April 17.

Of the eight players sidelined by injury who couldn't play in the last regular season game on April 13, six returned for the first game of the first playoff round, against Chicago on April 17. One of the six was Vladimir Tarasenko, who suffered a broken hand on March 15 with surgery on March 19, and was not expected to be evaluated until after the end of the first round. Only T. J. Oshie and Patrik Berglund won't be ready.

Fox Sports Midwest had a record broadcast season covering the team. The Blues were seen in 4% of homes in the St. Louis area market who had a television. The previous record was last year (2012–13 season) with a 3.9 rating. The Blues' rating ranked fifth among U.S.-based NHL teams.

May
Coach Ken Hitchcock, 62, was extended through the 2014–15 St. Louis Blues season on May 7, as were associate coach Brad Shaw and assistant coach Ray Bennett. The club announced that assistant coach Gary Agnew, and goaltending coach Corey Hirsch were not retained. Hitchcock was the 24th head coach of the Blues, starting on November 7, 2011. He had a 124-55-20 (.673) record in his three years, a record for a Blues' coach. He was an Edmonton, Alberta native, who has a 657-405-78 (.602) lifetime NHL coaching mark. On May 13, 2014, the Blues announced they had hired former Carolina Hurricanes head coach, Kirk Muller as an assistant coach to Hitchcock.

Standings

Schedule and results

Pre-season
Legend:

Regular season

Legend:

Playoffs

The St. Louis Blues entered the playoffs as the Central Division's second seed. They faced the Chicago Blackhawks in the first round.  
(Round 1 Schedule, Schedule, incl. networks/tickets)

The longest game in franchise history ended at 0:26 into the third overtime of Game 1 on April 17, with Alexander Steen scoring the game-winning goal to win, 4–3, ending the 100 min. 26 sec. marathon. Jaden Schwartz scored with 1:45 remaining in the third period to tie it at 3–3. A highlight was forward Maxim Lapierre after inadvertently getting shoved into the goal crease, and then making a save on a shot that sailed past Ryan Miller in the first overtime. The team ended its scoring drought after 148 minutes 39 seconds with Adam Cracknell's first-ever playoff goal at 4:40 into the first period. Jaden Schwartz and Vladimir Tarasenko also scored their first playoff goals. The home record for a playoff overtime game for the Blues had been 33:49 of extra time in a 5–4 win over Chicago on April 20, 1989. Jay Bouwmeester exited the game in the first overtime with dehydration symptoms, though he extended his consecutive games streak at 717, which at the time was the longest active stretch in major American professional sports. The Blues had 52 shots on goal to Chicago's 42. The previous longest game in franchise history was April 7, 1984, with the Blues winning 4–3 over Detroit at 17:07 into the second overtime.

Patrik Berglund returned for Game 3 (April 21) after suffering an upper-body injury on April 11 against Dallas. David Backes exited Game 2 on April 19 and was unable to return after an illegal hit to the head by Brent Seabrook at the 15:09 mark in the third period. Seabrook was given a 5-minute charging major and a Game Misconduct, and was subsequently suspended for three games by the NHL's Department of Player Safety. A teammate of Seabrook's was caught on camera taunting the injured Backes with a "Wakey, wakey, Backes" chant. While Duncan Keith claimed to not "remember everything" he said, several Blues players attributed the taunt to him in postgame interviews. The Blues led the series 2–0 after the April 19 game win, 4–3, with the game-winning goal scored 5:50 into the first overtime by Barret Jackman.

Game 3 on April 21 garnered the highest ratings ever for Fox Sports Midwest in broadcasting a Blues' game with an 11.9 household rating in the St. Louis market. The previous high was 11.0 on April 16, 2012, in the Blues' first-round win at San Jose. The Blues-Blackhawks game was the most-watched program that evening in St. Louis. Viewership peaked at the end of the game at a 14.7 rating/22 share/184,000 households. Game 1 on April 17 was the third-watched all-time with a 10.4 rating. The afternoon Game 2 on April 19 (KSDK) received an 11.2 rating.

Brenden Morrow missed Game 4, and was out for the remainder of the first round series. Game 5 on April 25 was broadcast on NBC Sports instead of Fox Sports Midwest. Game 6 on Sunday, April 27, was broadcast on NBC, at 2pm.

Vladimir Tarasenko, after four games (April 23) led the NHL with four playoff goals. Kevin Shattenkirk had one goal and four assists for five points, tied for second among defensemen.

The Blues got captain David Backes back for Game 5 at home (April 25), playing in 21:35 on 34 shifts, and the team outhitting Chicago 54–17, but it was for naught as the team lost 3–2 in the fourth overtime game, with them missing the net numerous times in shots, and too frequently an open net. Through the first five games, the Blues missed the net on 88 of their shot attempts, and had another 68 shots blocked by Chicago defenders. Coach Ken Hitchcock changed lines on both offense and defense with Alexander Steen joining Vladimir Sobotka and Vladimir Tarasenko on a second line.

Legend:

Player statistics

Skaters
Final stats

+ indicates on Injured Reserve. 
* indicates not currently on the active roster. 
Stats reflect time with Blues only. 
Stats reflect time with Blues only. 
Bold = leading team in category.

Goaltenders
(through final regular season game on April 13, 2014)

Playoffs
(through final game on April 27, 2014)

Milestones

Awards

Transactions

The Blues were involved in the following transactions during the 2013–14 season

Trades

Player signings

Free agents signed

Free agents lost

Claimed via waivers

Lost via waivers

Lost via retirement

Farm teams

Chicago Wolves
The Peoria (Illinois) Rivermen were the Blues American Hockey League affiliate in 2012–13

On April 1, 2013, the Blues announced that the Vancouver Canucks on March 29 agreed to buy the Rivermen from the Blues, pending approval from the NHL. It was expected the Blues would affiliate with the AHL's Chicago Wolves for the 2013–14 season. The Blues officially announced their affiliation with the Wolves on April 23, for at least three seasons. They played in the Allstate Arena in the Chicago suburb of Rosemont. The team was formerly affiliated with the Vancouver Canucks from 2011–2013, and the Atlanta Thrashers from 2001–2011. The swap was hard to take for the fans of the team, but the team's attendance was light, and the sponsorship not very strong. The team was one of the premier franchises in the AHL. The team's owner was Don Levin, coached by Scott Arniel, and their GM was Wendell Young.

St. Charles Chill
The Blues announced an affiliation with the St. Charles Chill of the Central Hockey League on October 17, and join the Chicago Wolves as a source for player development. The Chill begin their inaugural season on October 19, and played at the Family Arena in St. Charles.

Draft picks

St. Louis Blues' picks at the 2013 NHL Entry Draft, to be held in Newark, New Jersey on June 30, 2013.

Draft notes

 The St. Louis Blues' first-round pick went to the Calgary Flames as the result of an April 1, 2013, trade that sent Jay Bouwmeester to the Blues in exchange for Mark Cundari, the rights to Reto Berra, a 2014 first-round pick and this pick.
 The Ottawa Senators' second-round pick went to the St. Louis Blues as a result of a February 26, 2012, trade that sent Ben Bishop to the Senators in exchange for this pick.
 The St. Louis Blues' second-round pick went to the Buffalo Sabres as the result of a March 30, 2013, trade that sent Jordan Leopold to the Blues in exchange for a 2013 fifth-round pick and this pick.
 The Los Angeles Kings' second-round pick went to the St. Louis Blues as the result of a trade on June 30, 2013, that sent Tampa Bay's fourth-round pick in 2013 (94th overall) and St. Louis' third and fourth-round picks in 2013 (83rd and 113th overall) to Edmonton in exchange for this pick.     Edmonton had acquired this pick as the result of a trade on June 30, 2013, that sent a second-round pick in 2013 (37th overall) to Los Angeles in exchange for a third-round pick in 2013 (88th overall), Carolina's fourth-round pick in 2013 (96th overall) and this pick.
The St. Louis Blues' third-round pick went to the Edmonton Oilers as the result of a trade on June 30, 2013, that sent Los Angeles' second-round pick in 2013 (57th overall) to St. Louis in exchange for Tampa Bay's fourth-round pick in 2013 (94th overall), a fourth-round pick in 2013 (113th overall) and this pick.
 The Tampa Bay Lightning's fourth-round pick went to the Edmonton Oilers as the result of a trade on June 30, 2013, that sent Los Angeles' second-round pick in 2013 (57th overall) to St. Louis in exchange for a third and fourth-round pick in 2013 (83rd and 113th overall) and this pick.     St. Louis had acquired this pick as the result of a trade on July 10, 2012, that sent B. J. Crombeen and a fifth-round pick in 2014 to Tampa Bay in exchange for a fourth-round pick in 2014 and this pick.
 The Toronto Maple Leafs' fourth-round pick went to the St. Louis Blues as the result of a trade on June 30, 2013, that sent a seventh-round pick in 2013 (203rd overall) and a fourth-round pick in 2014 to Nashville in exchange for this pick.     Nashville had acquired this pick as the result of a trade on July 3, 2011 that sent Cody Franson and Matthew Lombardi to Toronto in exchange for Brett Lebda, Robert Slaney and this pick (being conditional at the time of the trade). The condition – Lombardi plays in 60 or more regular season games over the course of the 2011–12 and 2012–13 NHL seasons – was converted on April 3, 2012.
 The St. Louis Blues' fourth-round pick went to the Edmonton Oilers as the result of a trade on June 30, 2013, that sent Los Angeles' second-round pick in 2013 (57th overall) to St. Louis in exchange for a third-round pick in 2013 (83rd overall), Tampa Bay's fourth-round pick in 2013 (94th overall) and this pick.
 The St. Louis Blues' fifth-round pick went to the Buffalo Sabres as the result of a March 30, 2013, trade that sent Jordan Leopold to the Blues in exchange for a 2013 second-round pick and this pick.
The St. Louis Blues' seventh-round pick went to the Nashville Predators as the result of a trade on June 30, 2013, that sent Toronto's fourth-round pick in 2013 (112th overall) to St. Louis in exchange for a fourth-round pick in 2014 and this pick.

References

External links
2013–14 St. Louis Blues season at ESPN
2013–14 St. Louis Blues season at Hockey Reference

St. Louis Blues seasons
St. Louis Blues season, 2013-14
St
St. Louis Blues
St. Louis Blues